Clothiers Creek is a town located in north-eastern New South Wales, Australia, in the Tweed Shire.

Demographics

The median age of the Clothiers Creek population was 48 years, 11 years above the national median of 37.

79.5% of people living in Clothiers Creek were born in Australia. The other top responses for country of birth were England 3.9%, New Zealand 2.2%, Thailand 1.7%, Germany 1.1%, Canada 0.8%.

94.2% of people spoke only English at home; the next most common languages were 1.1% Thai, 0.8% Dutch, 0.8% French.

References 

Suburbs of Tweed Heads, New South Wales